This is a list of episodes for The Daily Show with Jon Stewart in 2010.

2010

January

February

March

April

May

June

July

August

September

October

November

December

References

 
2010 American television seasons